The Alawa people are an Indigenous Australian people from Arnhem Land in the Northern Territory of Australia. The suburb of Alawa in the Darwin's north, is named in their honour.

Language
The Alawa language is a non Pama-Nyungan language, classified by Jeffrey Heath as one of three of a subgroup, together with Marra and Warndarang, though this is now contested. It had only 18 speakers in a report dated 1991 (Ethnologue). That number was reduced to 12 by 2013. The speakers of Alawa are mainly adults, and most of the Alawa speak Kriol, though there are Alawa language revival efforts at the Minyerri School in the Alawa community.

Country

Lifestyle
The traditional lifestyle of the Alawa consisted of harvesting and hunting the abundant food resources provided by their land, which was rich in species of turtle, duck, crocodiles and fish. They had a technique of conserving foods for considerable periods. Norman Tindale was shown in 1922 a refuge cave they maintained at Mountain Creek well stocked with buried stores of water lily seeds, and roots, which were first sun-dried, then rubbed with red ochre before being wrapped and packed in paperbark sheets. After the loss of their lands they specialized in working as jackaroos on pastoral stations.

History
The Alawa tribe, like many others in the Roper River region, were hunted down in an extermination policy developed by the pastoral company that took over the Hodgson Downs in 1903, and remnants took refuge from the killing teams by seeking the protection of pastoralists who would employ them, or on church missions.

Native title
Together with the Ngandji people, the descendants of the Alawa have laid a native title claim to the Cox River block.

Notes

Citations

Sources

Aboriginal peoples of the Northern Territory